The 2022–23 Megyei Bajnokság I includes the championships of 20 counties in Hungary. It is the fourth tier of the Hungarian football league system.

Bács-Kiskun
Fourteen teams compete in the 2022-23 season.

League table
<onlyinclude>

Baranya
Fifteen teams competed in the 2022-23 season. However, Boda withdrew, therefore, finally only 14 teams competed.

League table
<onlyinclude>

Békés

League table
<onlyinclude>

Borsod-Abaúj-Zemplén

League table
<onlyinclude>

Budapest

League table
<onlyinclude>

Csongrád-Csanád

League table
<onlyinclude>

Fejér

League table
<onlyinclude>

Győr-Moson-Sopron

League table
<onlyinclude>

Hajdú-Bihar

League table
<onlyinclude>

Heves

League table
<onlyinclude>

Jász-Nagykun-Szolnok

League table
<onlyinclude>

Komárom-Esztergom

League table
<onlyinclude>

Nógrád

League table
<onlyinclude>

Pest

League table
<onlyinclude>

Somogy

League table
<onlyinclude>

Szabolcs-Szatmár-Bereg

League table
<onlyinclude>

Tolna

League table
<onlyinclude>

See also
 2022–23 Nemzeti Bajnokság I
 2022–23 Nemzeti Bajnokság II
 2022–23 Nemzeti Bajnokság III
 2022–23 Magyar Kupa

References

External links
  

1
Hungary
Megyei Bajnokság I